Old Brookville is a village located within the Town of Oyster Bay in Nassau County, on the North Shore of Long Island, in New York, United States. The village population was 2,020 at the time of the 2020 census. It is considered part of the greater Glen Cove area, which is anchored by the City of Glen Cove.

History 
Old Brookville incorporated as a village on November 7, 1929. The current Village Hall was dedicated in June 1963 on land donated by Alistair B. Martin.

Geography

Demographics

At the 2000 census there were 2,167 people, 722 households, and 618 families in the village. The population density was 545.2 people per square mile (210.8/km). There were 760 housing units at an average density of 191.2 per square mile (73.9/km).  The racial makeup of the village was 89.20% White, 1.43% African American, 7.34% Asian, 0.55% from other races, and 1.48% from two or more races. Hispanic or Latino of any race were 2.03%.

Of the 722 households 36.3% had children under the age of 18 living with them, 76.6% were married couples living together, 7.3% had a female householder with no husband present, and 14.4% were non-families. 11.2% of households were one person and 6.0% were one person aged 65 or older. The average household size was 3.00 and the average family size was 3.22.

The age distribution was 25.4% under the age of 18, 5.5% from 18 to 24, 23.1% from 25 to 44, 30.5% from 45 to 64, and 15.6% 65 or older. The median age was 43 years. For every 100 females, there were 97.7 males. For every 100 females age 18 and over, there were 91.8 males.

The median household income was $233,192 and the median family income  was $255,731. Males had a median income of $108,562 versus $82,625 for females. The per capita income for the village was $98,874. About 0.3% of families and 0.4% of the population were below the poverty line, including 0.2% of those under age 18 and 0.7% of those age 65 or over.

Government 
As of August 2021, the Mayor of Old Brookville is Bernard D. Ryba and the Village Trustees are William Clarke, Frank Galluzzo, Lori Golden, and John Vasilakis.

Education 
Old Brookville is primarily located within the boundaries of and is thus served by the North Shore Central School District. However, some of the eastern side of the village is within the boundaries of and is served by the Locust Valley Central School District. As such, students residing in Old Brookville who attend public schools will go to school in one of these two districts depending on where they live in the village.

Notable people

Rick DiPietro, Former National Hockey League Goalie for the New York Islanders
Jessica Foschi, Former competitive swimmer
Jose Reyes, Major League Baseball Player for the New York Mets
Garth Snow, Former National Hockey League Goalie and former General Manager of the New York Islanders
Chad Pennington, Former National Football League New York Jets and Miami Dolphins Quarterback

References

External links

Official website

Oyster Bay (town), New York
Villages in New York (state)
Villages in Nassau County, New York